The REC Diocese of Mid-America, with the Convocation of the West and Western Canada, is a Reformed Episcopal Church and an Anglican Church in North America diocese, since its foundation in 2009. The REC Diocese of Mid-America is distinct from a diocese of the same name of the Anglican Province of America, which is not affiliated with the Anglican Church in North America. It has 34 congregations, 32 in 12 American states, which are Arkansas, California, Colorado, Illinois, Louisiana, Michigan, Missouri, Mississippi, North Dakota, Nebraska, Oklahoma, Texas and Wisconsin, and 2 congregations in the Canadian province of British Columbia. Its headquarters are located in Katy, Texas. The Bishop Ordinary was the late Royal U. Grote, Jr., replaced upon his passing by the Bishop Coadjutor, Ray R. Sutton.

History
The origin of the Diocese of Mid-America goes back to 1990, when the Reformed Episcopal Church at its General Council decided to create the Special Jurisdiction of North America (SJNA) to cover parishes located west of the Mississippi River. The original territory covered 27 states. Their first Missionary Bishop elected was Royal U. Grote Jr, who moved to Houston, Texas, in July 1991. In 1996, the merger of the Special Jurisdiction of North America with the Synod of Chicago, the oldest of the Reformed Episcopal Church, led to the creation of the Diocese of Mid-America. A portion of the Diocese of Mid-America was combined with portions of the Diocese of the Northeast and Mid-Atlantic and the Diocese of the Southeast to form the Missionary Diocese of the Central States.  Another portion of the Diocese of Mid-America was also split off to help form the Diocese of the West.

The Reformed Episcopal Church took part in the Anglican realignment movement that led to the birth of the Anglican Church of North America, of which it was a founding member. The then six jurisdictions, including the Diocese of Mid-America, were in their original founding dioceses.

On 2 December 2012, the Church of the Holy Communion, in Dallas, was declared a Pro-Cathedral by Royal U. Grote, Jr.

The Diocese of Western Canada and Alaska, created in 1996, had two parishes in British Columbia, led by the Rt. Rev. Charles Dorrington, and also included the Missionary District of Cuba. Due to his small size, the diocese was extinct and incorporated in the Diocese of Mid-America, of which is now a part as the Convocation of the West and Western Canada, with Charles Dorrington as Assisting Bishop for Canada and Cuba.

References

External links
REC Diocese of Mid-America Official Website

Dioceses of the Anglican Church in North America
Anglican dioceses established in the 21st century
Dioceses of the Reformed Episcopal Church